Illa des Bosc is a small uninhabited island of the north west seaboard of the Spanish island of Ibiza. It is within the municipality of Sant Josep de sa Talaia and is a short distance due north of the beach of Cala Comte.

References

Islets of Ibiza
Uninhabited islands of Spain